Radif (meaning order) is a collection of many old melodic figures preserved through many generations by oral tradition. It organizes the melodies in a number of different tonal spaces called dastgah. The traditional music of Iran is based on the radif, which is a collection of old melodies that have been handed down by the masters to the students through the generations. Over time, each master's own interpretation has shaped and added new melodies to this collection, which may bear the master's name.

The preservation of these melodies greatly depended on each successive generation's memory and mastery, since the interpretive origin of this music was expressed only through the oral tradition.

To learn and absorb the essence of the radif, many years of repetition and practice are required. A master of the radif must internalize it so completely to be able to perform any part of it at any given time.

The radif contains several different dastgahs which are distinguished from each other by their relationship of note intervals and the form of the movement of the melodies within them. A dastgah portrays a specific sonic space. A dastgah may contain approximately 10 to 30  (melodies). The principal  of the dastgah specify the different scales within that dastgah. The shahed moves when we modulate between principal , and this movement creates a new sonic space. Rhythm in these melodies takes three different forms: symmetric, asymmetric (lang), and free form. The rhythm is greatly influenced by the rhythm and meter of  Persian poetry. The instrumental and vocal radif is different from the rhythmical point of view; however, their melodic structures are the same.

The radifs for tar are one of the most famous radifs associated, with many old melodies collected that include 20-40  in each dastgah.

The radifs of Mirza Hossein-Qoli and Mirza Abdollah are the oldest radifs that are still in use for many students who wish to carry on learning Persian music. It is very famous as it consisted of many melodies collected from that time and before.

Many of the melodies were changed by Mirza Gholi and some kept same to the composer's desire, but the evidence is small to suggest melodies were changed or not, but due to Radif being passed down through oral tradition (not in notation) we cannot state whether melodies were changed as we cannot compare notations or audios, but due to the mutations in music through oral transfer it is obvious.

One of the most notable Tar players and repertoire of Mirza Hossien Gholi's radif was Ostad Ali Akbar Shahnazi, who was the son of Mirza Hossien Gholi and was the first Tar player to record the long radif memorized by heart. His work is still used by many Masters and are now some directions which are followed by many Tar players. Of course, beginner-intermediate students will not be able to follow his works on audio due to the level at which it was performed at, so not much will be understood, but a Tar Master can expect to use it and re-focus on what was forgotten in his teachings at lesson with students. This can minimize mutations and keep the radif in line.

The radif of Mirza Abdollah was published in notation by Jean During in 1970s based on Nour Ali Boroumand who recorded the radif by heart. On the other hand, the radif of Mirza Hossein-Qoli was first published in notation by Dariush Pirniakan in 2001. Though the radif is not popular with many young students it still is the constitute and basis of Persian music. It can be related to Classical music of western music that is not much popular, but forms the basis of Western Music.

See also
Avaz (music)
Tasnif

External links
Radif at Wayback

 
Persian music
Melody
Masterpieces of the Oral and Intangible Heritage of Humanity